Holocaust and Memory (or more completely, Holocaust and Memory: The Experience of the Holocaust and its Consequences, an Investigation Based on Personal Narratives), originally published in 1996 in Polish and translated into English in 2001, is a book by Barbara Engelking and edited by Gunnar S. Paulsson. Engelking analyzes a series of Jewish survivors living in Poland to explore how their life under the Nazis impacted them. It was published in English by Leicester University Press.

Reception 
Aviel Roshwald reviewed the book in European History Quarterly. Reviews were also published in Holocaust and Genocide Studies, Shofar, and Ethnopolitics.

References

External links 

 

2001 non-fiction books
1996 non-fiction books
Personal accounts of the Holocaust